Christophe Saioni (born 1 February 1969) is a French former alpine skier who competed in the 1998 Winter Olympics and 2002 Winter Olympics. His wife is Maruša Ferk Saioni.

External links
 sports-reference.com

1969 births
Living people
French male alpine skiers
Olympic alpine skiers of France
Alpine skiers at the 1998 Winter Olympics
Alpine skiers at the 2002 Winter Olympics
Place of birth missing (living people)